The Commission for Academic Accreditation (CAA) is the national quality assurance and regulatory agency responsible for evaluation and accreditation of higher educational institutions and universities in the United Arab Emirates. Established in 2000, it comes under the country's Ministry of Education.

Working collaboratively with relevant national and local authorities in the Emirates, the CAA has a key leadership role in securing and developing the quality of higher education in the UAE. As a matter of the highest priority, it sets out to safeguard academic standards, and to assure and enhance the quality of learning opportunities provided for students in UAE's higher education institutions (HEIs). It undertakes licensure of HEIs in the UAE and accreditation of their award-bearing academic programs. In order to be entered in the National Register and receive Federal Recognition any HEIs offering post-secondary education in the UAE must receive institutional licensure and accreditation of their degree and diploma. CAA accreditation incorporates recognition of Diploma (Associate Degree), Higher Diploma, Bachelor's degree, Postgraduate Diploma, Master's degree and Doctorate Degree. These Degree ranges from level 5-10 as per National Qualification Framework of UAE (NQF UAE).

Mission and strategic aims 
The Mission of the CAA is: “To work collaboratively with stakeholders to assure quality, effectiveness, and continuous improvement of higher education, safeguard its system, embrace its diversity and foster the quality culture”.

Strategic Goals  

 Provide institutional licensure and program accreditation services using contemporary and internationally inspired Standards and efficient procedures.
 Facilitate the reform of Academic Programs to improve their outcomes and graduates’ market readiness, and to increase international recognition.
 Ensure an organizational culture that is based on a robust internal quality assurance system.
 Foster capacity building activities and a creative work environment within the Commission to further enhance its efficiency and effectiveness. 
 Adopt collaborative practices with other accreditation and education agencies to promote effective quality assurance processes and advance the role of the Commission as a leader of quality enhancement in higher education.

Commission structure 
The CAA is associated with the UAE Federal Government's Ministry of Education (MoE)  and is based in the UAE's capital city, Abu Dhabi. Its jurisdiction includes all seven of the Emirates of the UAE and overseas campuses of UAE-based higher education institutions. The CAA has number of Commissioners in various fields including business, engineering, computing, sciences, law, health sciences, humanities and arts. Its senior committee is the Council of Commissioners, composed of the executive director and all Commissioners. The Council meets biweekly, and approves all accreditation actions related to HEIs. The CAA is supported by administration staff executives, who are taking care of quality, archiving and logistics. A Strategic Advisory Committee consists of members of representative stakeholder groups in higher education in the UAE. The CAA provides strategic academic advisory support to senior leadership of MoE on academic mattes.

History 
Originally established in 2000 and associated with Ministry of Higher Education and Scientific Research for the purpose of assuring that private HEIs and programs meet international quality standards, the scope of the CAA's activities was broadened in 2012 to include licensure and accreditation of all HEIs in the country including governmental HEIs. Additional to its licensure and accreditation activities, the commission has responsibility for approval of substantive changes to HEIs and their programs and undertakes academic audits of HEI activities. It also investigates concerns about higher education provision and provides advice, support and development opportunities for HEIs in line with its Mission.

International relations 
The commission is a member of relevant organizations such as  the Arab Network for Quality Assurance in Higher Education (ANQAHE) and the International Network for Quality Assurance Agencies in Higher Education (INQAAHE), and it is recognized by the World Federation for Medical Education (WFME). The commission has established memoranda of understanding for cooperation with various international accreditation agencies such as the Association to Advance Collegiate Schools of Business International (AACSB), and the Accreditation Council for Pharmacy Education (ACPE).

Institutional licensure and program accreditation 
Institutional licensure and program accreditation are core activities of the CAA. Licensed institutions must demonstrate adherence to standards of performance covering all activities across the institution, follow principles of continuous improvement, and provide evidence of achieving student-learning outcomes. HEIs obtain licensure and program accreditation through submission of an application and supporting documentation to the CAA, which is normally followed by site visits by a Commissioner and a visiting committee of experienced academics (the External Review Team (ERT)) with appropriate international expertise. The ERT reviews institutions and their programs against the expectations of the CAA Standards for Institutional Licensure and Program Accreditation and international best practices, ERT can place requirements upon the institutions that they must meet in order to be recommended to the CAA Council of Commissioners for institutional licensure and program accreditation. The Standards are differentially applied in the consideration of applications for licensure or for program accreditation.

Risk Based Assessment 
The CAA depending on reviews and site visit plus data submitted by institution determines the risk and identifies institution as high confidence, medium confidence, and low confidence.

Institutional Licensure 
Initial licensure is granted for up to three years. It signifies that the institution has a mission appropriate to higher education and possesses the governance structure, by-laws, regulations, policies and procedures, physical and financial resources, educational programs, faculty and other personnel, and quality assurance measures sufficient to accomplish its mission. Renewal of licensure may be granted for a period of three, five or seven years according to a risk-based assessment of the institution.

Program Accreditation 
Initial program accreditation is designed to ensure that a fully developed curriculum and support services are in place. The External Review Team evaluates the program's structure and its constituent courses, and their requirements for specialist faculty and appropriate teaching and learning resources. Initial program accreditation is granted until program graduates its first cohort. Renewal of program accreditation is undertaken after a program has graduated its first cohort of students. An External Review Team evaluates whether the program's anticipated outcomes are being achieved, including the maintenance of academic standards in keeping with international norms, and the nature of the student experience. The periodicity of renewal of accreditation follows the same three, five, or seven-year cycle as that determined during risk analysis at renewal of institutional licensure.

Audits 
The CAA undertakes  periodic audits of HEI activities. It also investigates concerns about higher education provision and provides advice, support and development opportunities for HEIs in line with its Mission.

The Standards are supported by a comprehensive set of guidance documents that include procedural manuals for initial and renewal of licensure, initial and renewal of accreditation, a guide for External Review Teams, guidance on the QFEmirates (the UAE National Qualifications Framework), procedural manuals for online and blended learning and a volume of supplementary guidance to the Standards.

Standards for institutional licensure and program accreditation 
The CAA Standards for Institutional Licensure and Program Accreditation are designed to promote high quality institutions and to assure prospective students, their families, employers, and other stakeholders that licensed institutions and their programs meet levels of quality consistent with current international practice and professional judgment.

The CAA Standards for Institutional Licensure and Program Accreditation specify criterion-based institutional requirements which must be met by all HEIs operating in the UAE in order for them to be licensed and for their programs to be accredited. The CAA published its first Standards for Institutional Licensure and Program Accreditation in 2001. Subsequent revisions and expansions of the Standards included publication of the e-learning and Distance Learning Standards for Licensure and Accreditation in 2007 and the Standards for Licensure and Accreditation Technical and Vocational Education in 2009.  The most recent (version 6; 2019) version of the Standards incorporates the e-learning standards in a single, comprehensive document.

The Standards contain the following 11 standards:

Standard 1: Governance and Management

Standard 2: Quality Assurance

Standard 3: Educational Programs

Standard 4: Research and Scholarly Activities

Standard 5: Faculty and Professional Staff

Standard 6: Students

Standard 7: Health, Safety and Environment

Standard 8: Learning Resource Center

Standard 9: Fiscal Resources, Financial Management and Budgeting

Standard 10: Legal Compliance and Public Disclosure

Standard 11: Community Engagement

Institutional licensure: An institution's compliance with Standards 1,2,4,7,9,10 and 11 is evaluated in determining institutional licensure.

Program Accreditation: Compliance with Standards 2, 3, 4, 5, 6 and 8 is evaluated in determining program accreditation.

All of the relevant Standards must be met in order to receive a recommendation for licensure or accreditation. The Standards each include statements of the threshold quality criteria to be met by institutions and their programs. These are supported by a more detailed listing of Stipulations which describe good academic practice and explain how each of the Standards can be met effectively, and by 23 Annexes that provide further detail and aid institutions in complying fully with the criteria of the Standards.

See also
 List of recognized higher education accreditation organizations
 List of universities and colleges in the United Arab Emirates

References

External links
 CAA website

1999 establishments in the United Arab Emirates
Government agencies established in 1999
Organisations based in Abu Dhabi
Education in the United Arab Emirates
Commission for Academic Accreditation
Higher education accreditation
Government agencies of the United Arab Emirates
Accreditation organizations